Air São Tomé and Príncipe (Linhas Aéreas de São Tomé e Príncipe, Lda) was an airline based in São Tomé, São Tomé and Príncipe. It operated scheduled services within the islands and to neighbouring Gabon. Its main base was São Tomé International Airport. It lost its only aircraft in an accident in 2006.

History 
Air São Tomé was founded in 1993 to replace Equatorial International Airlines. The company was owned by TAP Portugal (40%), government of São Tomé and Príncipe (35%) and Mistral Voyages (1%).

Services 

Air São Tomé and Príncipe operated the following services (at January 2005):
Domestic scheduled destinations: Príncipe and São Tomé.
International scheduled destinations: Libreville.

Incidents and accidents
 On 23 May 2006, Air São Tomé and Príncipe's only aircraft, a DHC-6 Twin Otter Series 300, crashed in Ana Chaves Bay in the north east of São Tomé Island during a training flight. There were four fatalities, and the aircraft was damaged beyond repair.

Fleet 
Air São Tomé and Príncipe operated:

1 DHC-6 Twin Otter Series 300 registration S9-BAL, offered by TAP Portugal, and crashed during 2006.

References

Defunct airlines of São Tomé and Príncipe
Airlines established in 1993
Airlines disestablished in 2006
1993 establishments in São Tomé and Príncipe
2006 disestablishments in São Tomé and Príncipe